The siege of Goorumconda (15 September – 25 December 1791)  was a series of conflicts fought at Goorumconda, a hill fort northeast of Bangalore, during the Third Anglo-Mysore War. An army of the Nizam of Hyderabad, assisted by British East India Company forces, captured the outer works of the town on 20 November, after a one-month siege. Following this, the British troops, which had stormed the works, turned the town over to a detachment of the Nizam's troops. These were surprised and slaughtered by a detachment of Mysorean troops led by Tipu Sultan's son on 20 November 1791, who resupplied the fort. The works were again captured by the British on 25 December 1791.

References
History of the Madras Army, Volume 2

Marshman, John Clark (1863). The history of India

Goorumconda
Goorumconda 1791
Goorumconda 1791
Goorumconda 1791
Military history of India
1791 in India